Huzhen railway station is a railway station in Jinyun County, Lishui, Zhejiang, China. It is situated to the north of the built up area of Huzhen and was built with the Jinhua–Taizhou railway. It opened with the line on 25 June 2021.

The station has two side platforms and two through tracks, and a siding for freight. There is a station building containing an enclosed waiting area to the south of the line.

References 

Railway stations in Zhejiang
Railway stations in China opened in 2021
Buildings and structures in Lishui
Jinyun County